Kvitskarvbreen ("the white mountain glacier") is a glacier in Nathorst Land at Spitsbergen, Svalbard. It has a length of about 8.5 kilometers, and extend northwestwards from the mountain of Kvitskarvet to the valley of Bromelldalen. The glaciers of Lundbreen, Juvbreen and Zimmerbreen are all tributaries to Kvitskarvbreen.

References

Glaciers of Spitsbergen